VC may refer to:

Military decorations
 Victoria Cross, a military decoration awarded by the United Kingdom and also by certain Commonwealth nations
 Victoria Cross for Australia
 Victoria Cross (Canada)
 Victoria Cross for New Zealand
 Victorious Cross, Idi Amin's self-bestowed military decoration

Organisations
 Ocean Airlines (IATA airline designator 2003-2008), Italian cargo airline
 Voyageur Airways (IATA airline designator since 1968), Canadian charter airline
 Visual Communications, an Asian-Pacific-American media arts organization in Los Angeles, US
 Viet Cong (also Victor Charlie or Vietnamese Communists), a political and military organization from the Vietnam War (1959–1975)

Education
 Vanier College, Canada
 Vassar College, US
 Velez College, Philippines
 Virginia College, US

Places
 Saint Vincent and the Grenadines (ISO country code), a state in the Caribbean
 Sri Lanka (ICAO airport prefix code)
 Watsonian vice-counties, subdivisions of Great Britain or Ireland

Science and technology
 Vomiting center (area postrema), a structure in the brain
 Vital capacity, a maximum amount of air a person can expel from the lungs after a maximum inhalation

Chemistry
 Vanadium carbide, an inorganic compound
 Vinyl chloride, a chemical used in the production of PVC
 Victorium, a mixture of the elements gadolinium and terbium
 Vitamin C, a vitamin

Computing and telecommunications
 .vc, the country code top level domain (ccTLD) for Saint Vincent and the Grenadines
 VC dimension (Vapnik–Chervonenkis dimension), a measure of the capacity of a statistical classification algorithm
 Vapnik–Chervonenkis theory, a computational learning theory
 Version control in software development
 VideoCore, a processor architecture
 Videoconferencing
 Virtual circuit, a telecommunications arrangement
 Virtual console, a combination of a computer display and keyboard
 Virtual container, part of the SDH/SONET architecture of multiplexing protocols
 Microsoft Visual C++, a software development tool produced by Microsoft
 Volkov Commander, a computer program for managing files

Transportation
 Holden Commodore (VC), an automobile introduced by Holden in 1980
 Cruising speed, or VC, in aircraft design

Sports
 Vancouver Canucks, an NHL Hockey team from Vancouver Canada

Other uses
 Venture capital or venture capitalist, the financing of growing businesses
 Vi coactus (V.C., in Latin: "force coacted"), a handwritten signal made on a signed document
 Vice-Chancellor, the chief executive of a university
 The Victoria Cross, a British silent film directed by Harold M. Shaw
 Vietcong, a video game
 Viet Cong (or VC), a card game, see Tiến lên
 Virtual Console, a Nintendo video game download service for the Wii, 3DS, and Wii U game consoles

See also
 Vitrified clay pipe (VCP), clay and shale pipe
 VSee, a video chat and screen-sharing software tool